Kingdom City may refer to:
Kingdom City, Missouri
Jeddah Economic City (formerly Kingdom City)
Kingdomcity (Church)